WOAI may refer to:

 WOAI (AM), a radio station (1200 AM) licensed to San Antonio, Texas, United States
 WOAI-TV, a television station (channel 28, virtual 4) licensed to San Antonio, Texas, United States
 KAJA (FM), a radio station (97.3 FM) licensed to San Antonio, Texas, United States, which used the call sign WOAI-FM from April 1979 to October 1981
 World of AI, an extension for Flight Simulator X providing Artificial Intelligence plane traffic